The First McIlwraith Ministry was a ministry of the Government of Queensland and was led by Premier Thomas McIlwraith. It succeeded the Douglas Ministry on 21 January 1879 after the latter lost a vote of no confidence in Parliament after the 1878 election. It was in turn succeeded by the First Griffith Ministry on 13 November 1883 after losing the 1883 election.

First ministry

On 21 January 1879, the Governor, Sir Arthur Edward Kennedy, designated 6 principal executive offices of the Government, and appointed the following Members of the Parliament of Queensland to the Ministry as follows:

  Macrossan did not hold a seat at the time of his appointment; however, the member for Electoral district of Townsville resigned and Macrossan was seated in the Assembly on 4 March 1879.
  Pring lost his seat at a ministerial by-election on 29 May 1879 but continued as Attorney-General without a seat.

References
 
 Brisbane Courier, 22 January 1879.

Queensland ministries